Light of the World is a phrase used to describe Jesus in the New Testament.

Light of the World or The Light of the World may also refer to:

Paintings
 The Light of the World (painting), an allegorical painting by William Holman Hunt
 The Light of the World (Boucher), a 1750 oil on canvas painting by François Boucher

Music
 The Light of the World (Sullivan), an oratorio by Arthur Sullivan
 Light of the World (band), a British jazz fusion band
 Light of the World (album), a 2008 album by Kamasi Washington
 "Light of the World" (song), a 1993 song by English artist Kim Appleby
 "Light of the World (Sing Hallelujah)", a 2020 song by We the Kingdom

Literature
 Nur al-ʿAlam, an astronomical work by 14th-century scholar Joseph Naḥmias of Toledo 
 Light Of The World: The Pope, The Church and The Signs Of The Times by Pope Benedict XVI
 Light of the World, a 2013 novel by James Lee Burke
 "The Light of the World", a short story by Ernest Hemingway published in Winner Take Nothing (1933)

Other uses
 The Light of the World (film), a 2003 slide-show Christian film
 La Luz del Mundo (The Light of the World), a Christian denomination headquartered in Mexico